Stonewall is an American opera about the 1969 Stonewall riots, the spark of the modern LGBTQ rights movement, which received its world premiere June 2019 in conjunction with Stonewall 50 – WorldPride NYC 2019, projected to be the world's largest LGBTQ event. Stonewall was commissioned by New York City Opera (NYCO), and features music by Iain Bell, libretto by Pulitzer Prize-winning Mark Campbell, and direction by Leonard Foglia. The production is a 2019 Pride Initiative of the NYCO, an annual production of an LGBT-focused work each June in commemoration of Gay Pride Month. The opera premiered in June 2019 at the Rose Theater at Jazz at Lincoln Center. The opera was produced to honor both the 50th anniversary of the Stonewall Riots, and the 75th anniversary of the NYCO. Stonewall is the first opera to feature a transgender character written for an openly transgender singer, mezzo-soprano Liz Bouk.

NYCO Pride Initiatives 
Previous NYCO Pride Initiative productions have been 2018's American composer Charles Wuorinen's Brokeback Mountain based on Annie Proulx's 1997 short story "Brokeback Mountain", and 2017's Hungarian composer Péter Eötvös's Angels in America, an adaptation of Tony Kushner's play. Although NYCO has been active since 1943, it was revived in 2016 after a 2013 bankruptcy after which the Pride Initiative started. Stonewall is the first commissioned work of the revived NYCO. NYCO has faced fundraising challenges because of the bankruptcy but is hoping Stonewall will help revive finances.

Origins 
The Stonewall Riots a series of spontaneous, violent demonstrations by the LGBT community against yet another police raid that took place in the early morning hours of June 28, 1969, at the Stonewall Inn in Greenwich Village, is widely considered to constitute the most important event leading to the gay liberation movement and the modern fight for LGBT rights in the United States.

Gay Americans in the 1950s and 1960s faced an anti-gay legal system. The last years of the 1960s, however, were very contentious, as many social/political movements were active, including the civil rights movement, the counterculture of the 1960s, and the anti–Vietnam War movement. These influences, along with the liberal environment of Greenwich Village, served as catalysts for the Stonewall riots.

The NYCO relaunched from bankruptcy in January 2016 and had to cut the schedule from sixteen performances of four operas in 2017–18 to just Stonewall this season, plus several works in smaller venues. Stonewall was commissioned by the NYCO and its General Director Michael Capasso who matched up composer Iain Bell, and librettist Mark Campbell. They only had nine months to complete the project as although it had been shortlisted, the coincidence of the two event anniversaries coinciding had not been realized. When asked what they hoped audiences would remember from the experience they agreed, when diverse people band together they can end oppression.

Campbell was honored to do the work, even if at a very fast pace – a few weeks for the first draft, being gay and having been to the Stonewall Inn regularly. Bell worked on the score after finishing Jack the Ripper: The Women of Whitechapel, he describes Stonewall as being a joy with such a diverse cast of characters to score.

Characters 
Campbell based the characters on “the diverse people I’ve had the privilege to know and love as a gay man who has lived in downtown New York for several decades”, from his imagination rather than composites. He attempted to demonstrate how they were harassed in their daily lives and ultimately united “with humor, rage, and finally hope to rise up against the police”.

The characters and singers who portrayed them include:

Maggie (portrayed by Lisa Chavez), a butch lesbian dealing with police brutality,
Carlos (Brian James Myer), a gay Dominican-American English teacher who loses his job,
Renata (Jordan Weatherston Pitts), aka Maynard, an African-American drag queen,
Valerie (Rocky Eugenio Sellers), Renata's sister, another transvestite,
Larry (Marc Heller), an NYPD deputy inspector,
Sarah (Lucas Bouk), a trans woman hippie celebrating the first anniversary of her transitioning,
Edward (Justin Ryan), a closeted financial adviser,
Andy (Andrew Bidlack), a white teen kicked out of his home, who lives on the streets,
Leah (Jessica Fishenfeld), a Jewish lesbian,
Sal, a Mafia – controlled club manager – Michael Corvino
Troy, a straight gogo boy who is a gay-for-pay hustler and uses drugs – Joseph Beutel
Police officers:
Cahn: Peter Kendall Clark
Giordano: John Allen Nelson
Andrews: Andrew Wannigman
Romano: Michael Kuhn
Economides: Julia Snowden
Williams: Kristin Renee Young
Hennessey: Michael Boley

Additional cast members included Michael Corvino, and Jessica Fishenfeld; Carolyn Kuan conducted. Richard Stafford was the choreographer.

Music 
Iain Bell said about writing the music, “it was a joy to be able to wink to various elements of 1960s music-making throughout, so riffs are explored and harmonic progressions are occasionally more reminiscent of those of popular music of the time”. He wrote two jukebox songs, recorded with iconic girl group legend Darlene Love, with lyrics by Campbell opening Part II. “A jukebox features "Today's The Day," about a wedding, and "Better Days Ahead," a sad song in the style of Shirley Bassey.”

Plot 
Over 75 minutes the story takes place in three parts, all in New York City; first part in many locations, then at the Stonewall Inn, both inside and out, and then ultimately on Christopher Street before dawn.

See also 

 Conversion therapy
 Intersectionality
 LGBT culture

Notes and references

Notes

References

Sources

External links 
"Stonwall", New York City Opera

2019 operas
LGBT-related operas
Operas
Operas about politicians
Operas set in the 20th century
Operas set in the United States
Political operas